International Ethical, Scientific and Political Collegium, also called Collegium International , is a high-level group created in 2002.

Origin
The International Ethical, Political and Scientific Collegium is committed, according to its founders, "to respond intelligently and forcefully to the decisive challenges facing humankind". An appeal calling for the Collegium's establishment was made public in February 2002 in New York and its membership was officially presented on April 2, 2003 in Brussels before the European Parliament.

Collegium members and associate members, signatories of the Appeal, are scientists, philosophers and present and former Heads of State and Government.

Composition
Co-created by Michel Rocard, a former Prime Minister of France, Milan Kučan, who at the time of the Collegium's founding served as President of the Republic of Slovenia, and Stéphane Hessel, french diplomat, the group's members include: 

 philosopher Edgar Morin, Honorary Président
French "Défenseur des Droits", Jacques Toubon, Président
Director-General of the World Trade Organization (WTO), Pascal Lamy, Vice-Président
former President Fernando Henrique Cardoso of Brazil
 former President Alpha Oumar Konaré of Mali
 Ruth Dreifuss, former Federal Counsellor of Switzerland
 philosopher Peter Sloterdijk
philosopher Jürgen Habermas
 philosopher Jean-Pierre Dupuy
 international-law professor Mireille Delmas-Marty
international relations professor Michael W. Doyle
 Mary Robinson, former President of Ireland and UN High Commissioner for Human Rights
 Nobel Prize winner Joseph Stiglitz
 Nobel Prize winner Amartya Sen
ambassador of France, Bernard Miyet 
 former ambassador of the USA William vanden Heuvel

The film-producer Sacha Goldman serves as the Collegium's Secretary General.

Open letters, public meetings, conferences, etc.
 September 2004: Open letter to the candidates of the 2004 United States presidential election, President George W. Bush and Senator John Kerry, published  in The Nation, US-based weekly magazine
 March 2007: Roundtable in Geneva on the realisation of economic, social and cultural rights
 September 2007: Roundtable in Paris about Science and Politics
2014: "Global Solidarity, Global Responsibility: An Appeal for World Governance"

External links
 Collegium International Official Website
 An Ethical Think-link By Sacha Goldman United Nations UN Chronicle 2004
 It's a Small Word After All by Katrina vanden Heuvel, The Nation, Sept.16, 2004
  Plenary Meeting of the International Ethical, Scientific and Political Collegium (13-14 October 2006)

Notes

Think tanks based in France
Global policy organizations